The Western Canada Concept was a Western Canadian federal political party founded in 1980 to promote the separation of the provinces of Manitoba, Saskatchewan, Alberta and British Columbia, and the Yukon and Northwest Territories (which included present-day Nunavut) from Canada in order to create a new nation.

History
The party argued that Western Canada could not receive fair treatment while the interests of Quebec and Ontario dominated Canadian politics. The party gained popularity in Alberta when western alienation was at its height following the federal Liberal government announcement of the National Energy Program in October 1980, which aimed to ensure low energy costs for Canadian industry and consumers at the expense of Alberta, Canada's major producer of oil and gas.

A member of the party, Gordon Kesler, was elected to the Alberta legislature in a 1982 provincial by-election in Olds-Didsbury riding that drew national attention. The best showing for the party came later in the same year in the Alberta general election, where they took 11.8 per cent of the vote, but did not elect any MLAs (Kesler lost his seat).

Kesler became leader of the Alberta WCC with his election to the legislature.  In 1984, he was replaced by Jack Ramsay, later a federal Reform Member of Parliament.  Some of the more doctrinaire figures in the party opposed Ramsay's leadership, claiming that he was not genuinely committed to western independence.

The Saskatchewan branch of the party attracted two sitting members of the Legislative Assembly who represented the party for a few months in 1986 before being kicked out of the party.

In 1987, a group of Alberta members who were dissatisfied with the party's leadership and direction left the party to establish the Western Independence Party.

The most prominent leader of the party was Doug Christie, a British Columbia lawyer best known for having represented neo-Nazis James Keegstra, Ernst Zündel and Wolfgang Droege.  To distance itself from Christie, the national party expelled him from the leadership in 1981 and denied him a membership in the party's Alberta branch.  He later became leader of British Columbia's provincial WCC and ran for the party at the national and provincial levels several times.  In 2005, he announced the creation of the Western Block Party which would be a western version of the Bloc Québécois.

At the time of his death in 2013 Christie maintained a website with the "Western Canada Concept" name, but Western Canada Concept was no longer a registered political party.

Party program

 Independence for Western Canada, chosen by the people of each of the four Western provinces and northern territories in a referendum.
 A citizen's constitutionally established right of reasonably accessible referendum, initiative and recall.
 Protection for the sanctity and safety of human life, property and security of the person and their fundamental freedoms.
 Equal rights for all, with no special status for any race, or ethnic origin.
 A federal republic with a two-house legislature, one elected by population the other by region, both with original legislative jurisdiction and both required to approve before a law was enacted.
 One official language of Western Canada.
 The establishment of a balanced budget by law under the constitution so no future debts can be incurred by government.

See also 
List of political parties in Canada
 Secessionist movements of Canada
Western Canada Concept Party of British Columbia
Western Canada Concept Party of Manitoba
Western Canada Concept Party of Saskatchewan
Wexit
Wexit Canada

External links
Western Canada Concept
Western Canada Concept – Canadian Political Parties and Political Interest Groups – Web Archive created by the University of Toronto Libraries

Federal political parties in Canada
Defunct secessionist organizations in Canada
Defunct political parties in Canada
Politics of Western Canada
Political parties established in 1980
1980 establishments in Canada
1980 in Canadian politics